The 2008 Melbourne Football Club season was the club's 109th year in the VFL/AFL.

In conjunction with the AFL celebrating 150 years since the sport of Australian rules football was first created, the Melbourne Football Club also celebrated its 150th anniversary since its foundation in 1858. This included the celebration of their "150 Heroes", which commemorated the 150 greatest contributing players to ever play for Melbourne. Despite the celebrations, the Demons were tarnished by major on and off field disasters that led to the resignation of Paul Gardiner as chairman of the club and installation of Jim Stynes midway through the season. During August, Jim Stynes attempted to eliminate Melbourne of its major debt with a program called "Debt Demolition".

Melbourne hosted 10 of its 11 games at the MCG, which included its first "home game" against the Brisbane Lions outside of the Gabba since 2000. They also played a home game at Manuka Oval in the nation's capital Canberra against the Sydney Swans during Round 13. Dean Bailey coached his first year as senior coach at Melbourne. David Neitz captained his ninth year for the Demons, however after aggravating a disc in his neck during the Round 5 clash against Carlton, he announced his retirement on 19 May. For the remainder of the year, the captaincy was shared between Cameron Bruce and James McDonald.

Melbourne's horrid year on-field form caused them to win only three matches and ensured they received their 11th wooden spoon.

2008 list changes

2007 trades

Retirements and delistings

National draft

Pre-season draft

Rookie draft

2008 squad

2008 season

Pre-season

NAB Cup

Week 1

NAB Challenge

Week 2

Week 3

Week 4

Home and away season

Round 1

Round 2

Round 3

Round 4

Round 5

Round 6

Round 7

Round 8

Round 9

Round 10

Round 11

Round 12

Round 13

Round 14

Round 15

Round 16

Round 17

Round 18

Round 19

Round 20

Round 21

Round 22

Ladder

Ladder breakdown by opposition

Awards

Brownlow Medal tally

Keith 'Bluey' Truscott Medal tally (top 10)

Keith 'Bluey' Truscott Trophy – Cameron Bruce

Sid Anderson Memorial Trophy (Second in the Best and Fairest) – Brock McLean

Ron Barassi Snr Memorial Trophy (Third in the Best and Fairest) – Brad Green

Ivor Warne-Smith Memorial Trophy (Fourth in the Best and Fairest) – Matthew Warnock

Dick Taylor Memorial Trophy (Fifth in the Best and Fairest) – James McDonald

Harold Ball Memorial Trophy (Best First Year Player) – Cale Morton

Troy Broadbridge Trophy (highest polling MFC player in the Casey Best and Fairest) – Adem Yze

Ron Barassi Leadership Award – Brad Green

Ian Ridley Club Ambassador Award – Clint Bartram

Norm Smith Memorial Trophy (Coach's Award) – Matthew Warnock

Leading Goalkicker Award – Brad Miller (26)

150 Heroes
Melbourne FC announced its "150 Heroes" to celebrate its 150th birthday at Crown Casino on 7 June 2008. These were also presented during the Queen's Birthday Clash against Collingwood in Round 11.  Each player, or their closest relative, were presented with an official 150 heroes medallion.

The criteria for inclusion was games played (minimum of 100), best-and-fairest awards, premierships, Brownlow Medals, contribution to the club and State representation.  Those who died in the war were judged based on their achievements before their death.
The heroes named were:

Jim Abernethy,
Frank Adams,
Bill Allen,
Stan Alves,
Syd Anderson,
Tony Anderson,
Lance Arnold,
Ron Baggott,
Garry Baker,
Harold Ball,
Ron Barassi,
Percy Beames,
John Beckwith,
George Bickford,
Ray Biffin,
Barry Bourke,
Harry Brereton,
Cameron Bruce,
Keith Carroll,
Geoff Case,
Albert Chadwick,
Noel Clarke,
Geoff Collins,
Jack Collins,
Chris Connolly,
Bob Corbett,
Denis Cordner,
Don Cordner,
Ted Cordner,
Vin Coutie,
Harry Coy,
Jim Davidson,
Frank Davis,
Ross Dillon,
Carl Ditterich,
Brian Dixon,
Len Dockett,
Adrian Dullard,
Hugh Dunbar,
Richie Emselle,
Fred Fanning,
Jeff Farmer,
Matthew Febey,
Steven Febey,
Dick Fenton-Smith,
Rowley Fischer,
Robert Flower,
Laurie Fowler,
Maurice Gibb,
Peter Giles,
Terry Gleeson,
Brad Green,
Rod Grinter,
George Haines,
Gary Hardeman,
Henry Harrison,
Gerard Healy,
Greg Healy,
Dick Hingston,
Paul Hopgood,
Danny Hughes,
Anthony Ingerson,
Eddie Jackson,
Alan Johnson,
Bob Johnson,
Tassie Johnson,
Trevor Johnson,
Travis Johnstone,
Gordon Jones,
Les Jones,
Bryan Kenneally,
Allan La Fontaine,
Clyde Laidlaw,
Frank Langley,
Jack Leith,
Andrew Leoncelli,
Charlie Lilley,
Wally Lock,
Harry Long,
John Lord,
Andy Lovell,
Brett Lovett,
Glenn Lovett,
Garry Lyon,
Hassa Mann,
George Margitich,
Peter Marquis,
Bernie Massey,
Anthony McDonald,
James McDonald,
Fred McGinis,
Shane McGrath,
Bob McKenzie,
Col McLean,
Ian McLean,
Noel McMahen,
Ken Melville,
Laurie Mithen,
Peter Moore,
Jack Mueller,
David Neitz,
Stephen Newport,
Jack O'Keefe,
Andrew Obst,
Gordon Ogden,
Greg Parke,
Joe Pearce,
Jack Purse,
Ian Ridley,
Guy Rigoni,
Frank Roberts,
Russell Robertson,
Alby Rodda,
Brian Roet,
Peter Rohde,
Alan Rowarth,
David Schwarz,
Norm Smith,
Steven Smith,
Earl Spalding,
Stuart Spencer,
Charlie Streeter,
Steven Stretch,
Jim Stynes,
Tony Sullivan,
Dick Taylor,
Ted Thomas,
Ian Thorogood,
Stephen Tingay,
John Townsend,
Keith Truscott,
Geoff Tunbridge,
Bill Tymms,
Barrie Vagg,
Francis Vine,
Todd Viney,
Ivor Warne-Smith,
Ray Wartman,
Athol Webb,
Greg Wells,
Jeff White,
Sean Wight,
Don Williams,
Brian Wilson,
Stan Wittman,
Shane Woewodin,
Graeme Yeats,
Charlie Young,
Adem Yze

Off-field crises and debt demolition
Aside from Melbourne's on-field struggles throughout the year, they were also placed into financial turmoil and the possibility of filing for bankruptcy.

On 4 February, CEO Steve Harris announced his resignation after reportedly cutting Melbourne's pre-existing debt by 50% and increasing membership sales by 40% since 2003. He was later replaced by former Wimbledon tennis champion Paul McNamee on 18 March, despite the fact that McNamee did not originally apply for the job.

With no cash, no solidified training or administration base and decreased membership count from 2007, the Demons found themselves winning only one game in the first half of the season. On 23 May, Hawthorn president Jeff Kennett suggested that Melbourne should relocate to the Gold Coast if they were to have a financially stable future. Melbourne was expected to lose $1–2 million during the year and put their near future as an existing football club in doubt.

Melbourne had little to celebrate heading into their 150 Heroes dinner on 7 June, during which Jim Stynes announced his intention to challenge Paul Gardiner's role as Melbourne's president. Two days later, before the Queen's Birthday clash, Gardiner announced his resignation as Melbourne's president, and endorsed Stynes to take over.  On 12 June, Stynes was announced as the new president of the Melbourne Football Club and announced his primary intention to wipe off Melbourne's debt. Three days later he announced that Melbourne was $4.5 million in debt and that he would create a campaign called Debt Demolition to wipe off the debt. The campaign took place during August, beginning on 5 August during the 150 Foundation Heroes dinner. Guests and supporters were asked to dig deep and donate at least $5,000 dollars to be considered a 150 Foundation Hero.

During June, Melbourne had a late surge in membership purchases for 2008. On 30 June, Melbourne successfully increased their membership count from 2007 gaining a record high 29,619 members at the time and falling just short of their goal of 30,000.

On 23 July, Stynes sacked Paul McNamee as CEO of the club. During his time as CEO, NcNamee was criticised for taking a mid-season holiday to England to play in a Wimbledon doubles match. He was also criticised for trying to lure Brisbane Lions' forward Jonathan Brown to Melbourne. Stynes stated, however, that the main reason he was sacked was his lack of a football background.

Melbourne held its 150 Foundation Heroes dinner on 5 August where they launched their Debt Demolition campaign. Melbourne raised $1.3 million from former players and supporters that night. At the end of the month the club had raised up to $3 million. Despite all the donations Melbourne received, their major sponsor Primus Telecom announced that it would not continue its $1 million per year arrangements with the club in 2009.

On 26 August, Melbourne announced Cameron Schwab as their new CEO. Schwab left his role of CEO at Fremantle and re-joined Melbourne for the third time since 1982.

On 18 December, the AFL agreed to increase Melbourne's 2009 from $250,000 to $1 million, with the Melbourne Cricket Club (MCC) contracted to match the AFL's offer. However, financial disagreements between the MCC and AFL prevented them from co-funding all Victorian clubs temporarily until an agreement was worked out on 20 December.

Melbourne finished the year $2.5 million in debt. They continued with the Debt Demolition campaign in August 2009, finishing the year with a debt of $1.5 million, and in August 2010. On 5 August 2010 Melbourne clear all of its $4.5 million debt as Jim Stynes announced the club to be debt free for the first time in 30 years.

References

External links
Official website of the Melbourne Football Club
 Official website of the AFL 

Melbourne Football Club Season, 2008
2008
Melbourne Football Club